Celebrate the Difference is an album by Terri Hendrix.

Album information
 Terri Hendrix - Vocals, Acoustic Guitar, Mandolin, and Harmonica
 Lloyd Maines - Acoustic and Electric Guitar, Papoose, Mandolin, Steel, Banjo, Electric Bass, and Vocals
 Glenn Fukunaga - Upright Bass and Ukulele
 Paul Pearcy - Percussion
 Riley Osbourn - Keyboards
 Dennis Ludiker - Fiddle
 Noah Jeffries - Mandolin
 Mark Rubin - Tuba
 Stan Smith - Clarinet
 Mark "Speedy" Gonzalez - Trombone
 Joel Guzman - Accordion
 Kids Choir - Declan Maguire, Slade Pasdar, Danielle Meador, Jacy Meador,
 Rainey Tsukifuji, Carolene Tsukifuji, and Lily Remmert

Produced by Lloyd Maines

Album Tidbits
 Two of Lloyd's grandchildren are in the Kids Choir.. Slade Pasdar and Declan Maguire
 A few songs on the album can be found on some of Terri's previous albums
 Lloyd paid his grandsons a dollar a piece to get them to sing in the choir.

Track listing
 Peggy the Goat
 Celebrate the Difference
 Play Ball
 Get Your Goat On
 First Place
 I Want to Be Your Friend
 Invisible Friend
 Car Car
 Nerves
 Critters
 A Place in the Choir
 Lluvia De Estrellas
 Yeah Yeah Yeah
 Walkin' On the Moon
 Peggy the Goat Reprise

References

2005 albums
Terri Hendrix albums